William Edward Stratton   (1858 – January 31, 1900) was an American professional baseball player, who played for the 1873 Baltimore Marylands team. Having been born in 1858 (exact date unknown), Ed Stratton is the youngest player ever to play in the history of Major League Baseball, having debuted at most 15 years, 133 days of age. (Joe Nuxhall, who is commonly believed to hold this distinction, debuted at 15 years, 316 days of age.)

References

External links

Major League Baseball pitchers
Baseball players from Maryland
Baltimore Marylands players
Richmond Virginias players
Norfolk (minor league baseball) players
19th-century baseball players
1858 births
1900 deaths